David George Pilch (born 2 February 1943) is a former English cricketer.  Pilch was a right-handed batsman who bowled right-arm medium pace.  Outside of cricket, Pilch played hockey at county level for Norfolk.  He was born in West Kirby, Cheshire.

Pilch made his debut for Norfolk in the 1961 Minor Counties Championship against Staffordshire.  Pilch played Minor counties cricket for Norfolk from 1961 to 1983, which included 215 Minor Counties Championship appearances and a single MCCA Knockout Trophy appearance.  He made his List A debut against Hampshire in the 1965 Gillette Cup.  He made 4 further List A appearances for Norfolk, the last coming against Glamorgan in the 1983 NatWest Trophy.  Primarily a bowler, Pilch took 9 wickets in limited-overs cricket for Norfolk, which came at an average of 20.00, with best figures of 3/15.

Playing for Norfolk allowed him to represent Minor Counties North, with Pilch making his debut for the team against Nottinghamshire in the 1974 Benson & Hedges Cup.  He made 2 further List A appearances for the team, against Yorkshire and Nottinghamshire in the 1975 Benson & Hedges Cup.  With the ball, he took just 2 wickets for the team, which came at an average of 44.50, with best figures of 1/38.

His grandfather, Robert Pilch, played football for Tottenham Hotspur, Everton and Norwich City.  His great-great uncle, William Pilch, played first-class cricket for Kent.

References

External links
David Pilch at ESPNcricinfo
David Pilch at CricketArchive

1943 births
Living people
People from West Kirby
English cricketers
Norfolk cricketers
Free Foresters cricketers
Minor Counties cricketers
English male field hockey players
Cricketers from Cheshire